The Atlantic Attack is a ringette team in the Canadian National Ringette League (NRL) that mostly consists of players from Atlantic Canada and is based in Dieppe, New Brunswick. The team competes in the Eastern Conference in the White division and was founded in 2011. Its home arena is in Cocagne, New Brunswick. In their 7th season, the Atlantic Attack won their first National Ringette League Playoff title. In the past the Attack also competed against Bourassa Royal before that NRL team was discontinued.

Team history 
The Attack's inaugural season was in 2011–12. The first team roster was announced on September 21, 2011   and their first game in the league was played on October 15, 2011 against Gatineau Fusion. The first game in their home arena in Cocagne was played on February 5, 2012, against Le Royal de Bourassa. In their first season they made the Eastern Playoffs, but with two losses in two games did not continue to the 2011-12 NRL Championship, which is played by the eight best teams in the league.

For the 2012–13 season, the Attack had 16 returning players and additionally the newcomers Nicole Richard (defense) and Marissa Babin (goaltender). This season also saw the first appearance of Jenny Snowdon, younger sister of defense player Jessica Snowdon. On her National Ringette League debut weekend with Attack on December 15 and 16 against Rive Sud Revolution and Winnipeg Prairie Fire, at age 15, she managed to score three hat tricks in her first three games, which was a phenomenal start to a successful career with the Attack. Jenny Snowdon ended up playing five game in that season and finished with eleven goals and three assists. Despite a solid performance in their second season the 2013 NRL championship on home ice in Fredericton, New Brunswick, proved a difficult test for the Atlantic Attack. The team ended up with seven losses in seven games and therefore ended on the last place. Nevertheless, forward Martine Caissie managed to propel herself into the NRL top 20 scorer list with 41 goals and 25 assists.

In the 2013–14 season, the team saw a huge change in the roster with eleven rookies also being the youngest team in the league with seven players under the age of 18. With completely changed defensive and offensive lines the Attack had their worst season start with nine losses. The first win of the season could be achieved on November 23 against Le Royal de Bourassa. This season saw the first time three of the four Snowdon sibling in the NRL (Jessica, Kelly and Jenny Snowdon). Miguelle Proulx ended in her first season as scoring leader for the team with 42 goals and 10 assists. The troubling season ended with 6 points and the last place in the NRL regular season and therefore no spot in the Eastern Conference playoffs.

The 2014–15 season saw most of the players from the previous year and the experienced players Martine Caissie, Joelle Proulx and Jocelyne Landry returning after a one-year hiatus. The team's season started early in Ottawa on September 27 and 28 against Ottawa Ice. 2014 ended for the team claiming the 7th place out of eleven teams in the Eastern Conference and their first ever win against Montreal Mission in their 4th season. The rest of the season saw them drop to the 9th place in the Eastern conference and a three-game elimination series against Gloucester Devils for a spot in the 2015 NRL Championship in Wood Buffalo, Alberta. The Attack lost two games against Gloucester Devils and therefore did not qualify for the 2015 NRL Championship. Nevertheless, the team had a very successful season after a disappointing 2013–14 season with Jenny Snowdon finishing in the top 20 league scoring with 38 goals and 33 assists.

On October 3, 2015, the Attack opened the 2015–16 season with three wins against Rive Sud Revolution in Fredericton. The team had their best season start in team history with 15 victories and only three losses by mid December, claiming the first place in the Eastern conference and Martine Caissie leading the NRL scoring board with 42 goals and 18 assists. Finishing their best season so far with a 4th overall and 3rd place in the Eastern Conference regular season, the team brings the Eastern Conference Playoffs to Atlantic Canada for the first time. With two wins against Le Royal de Bourassa the Attack secure a spot in the NRL championship 2016 in London, Ontario. The team ended the championship with the 7th place.

Season six sees almost the same roster as the previous season. After their best season behind them, expectations were high for the 2016–17 season. With a third-place finish in the Eastern Conference the Attack were directly qualified for the NRL championship in Leduc, Alberta. After losing the opening game, the team won the six following games, securing the first place in the round-robin, earning the direct bye to the finals against six time NRL champion Cambridge Turbos, who were also crowned NRL champion the previous three seasons. With a 6–5 defeat the Attack won the silver medal and their first podium finish since the joined the National Ringette League in 2011. Goalie Karine Doiron and forward Martine Caissie were named first-team all-stars.

The 2017–18 season again saw most of the players returning from the very successful previous season and for the first time all four Snowdon sisters playing for Attack (Jessica, Kelly, Jenny and Britney Snowdon). The regular season saw them in 3rd place in the Eastern Conference and 4th place overall. The team claimed the 3rd place in the Eastern Conference Playoffs and claimed a spot for the NRL championship in Winnipeg, Manitoba. With six wins and one loss, claiming the 1st place in the round robin, the Attack received a direct bye to the gold medal game. In a 5–3 win against three time NRL champion Edmonton WAM! the attack win their first NRL championship in their 7th season.

With 17 returning players for the 2018–19, season the team could secure the 4th place in the regular season. After eliminating Richmond Hill Lightning in the Eastern Conference playoffs, the Attack got the opportunity to defend their title from the previous season. The 2019 Canadian Ringette Championships took place in Summerside and Charlottetown, Prince Edward Island. The Attack was defeated 3-5 by Calgary RATH in the final.

The 2019–20 season saw several key players leaving the team. Karine Doiron (No. 30) and Martine Caissie (No. 77) joined Gatineau Fusion, while Josee Doiron (No. 16), Joelle Proulx (No. 22), Ashley Hollis (No. 6) and Jessica Snowdon (No. 7) retired. General manager Hélène L. Beaulieu also stepped down. After a challenging season putting the Attack on the 9th overall place in the regular season, the NRL Championship was cancelled due to the start of the COVID-19 pandemic.

Due to the COVID-19 pandemic, the 2020-21 NRL season was cancelled.

League competition 2022–23 season

In 2022–23, the NRL entered its 18th season with thirteen teams competing:

Western Conference
 BC Thunder
 Edmonton Black Gold Rush
 Edmonton WAM!
 Calgary RATH
 Saskatchewan Heat
 Manitoba Herd

Eastern Conference Red
 Nepean Ravens
 Waterloo Wildfire
 Gatineau Fusion
 Cambridge Turbos

Eastern Conference White
 Montreal Mission
 Rive-Sud Révolution
 Atlantic Attack

Year by year
Year by year listing of all season played by Atlantic Attack

GP = Games played, W = Wins, L = Losses, OTL = Overtime losses, SOL = Shootout losses, Pts = Points, Pct = Percentage, GF = Goals for, GA = Goals against

 Due to the COVID-19 pandemic, the NRL championship was cancelled.

 Due to the COVID-19 pandemic, the complete 2020-21 NRL season was cancelled.

Roster 2022–23 season 
The following is the Attack's roster for the 2022–23 season.

Roster 2018–19 season

Roster 2019–20 season

Other teams
The Atlantic Attack has competed against a number of other NRL teams including the Bourassa Royal, Montreal Mission, Calgary RATH, Rive-Sud Révolution, and the Cambridge Turbos.

See also

 Ringette
 National Ringette League
 Cambridge Turbos
 Montreal Mission
 Bourassa Royal
 Calgary RATH
 Rive-Sud Révolution

References

External links 
 Atlantic Attack Twitter
 National Ringette League Website
 Ringette Canada

National Ringette League
NRL
Sports teams in New Brunswick
Ringette
Ringette players
Women's sports teams
Women's sports teams in Canada